Hănăşeşti may refer to several villages in Romania:

 Hănăşeşti, a village in Gârda de Sus Commune, Alba County
 Hănăşeşti, a village in Poiana Vadului Commune, Alba County

Hăsnăşeni 
 Hăsnăşenii Mari, a commune in Drochia district, Moldova
 Hăsnăşenii Noi, a commune in Drochia district, Moldova.